Kuwait's fourth district consists of 18 large residential areas extending from Farwaniya to Jahra. Other major residential areas include Ardhiya, Sabah Al-Nasser, Firdous, Omariya, Rabiya, Jleeb Al-Shuyoukh and Andalus.

Areas of the Fourth District

Farwaniya
Firdous
Omariya
Rabiya
Riggae & Andalous
Jleeb Al-Shuyoukh
Sabah Al-Nasser
Shadadiya
Sihad Al-Awazem
Rehab
Udhailiyah
Ardiya
Ishbilya
Abdullah Al-Mubarak
New Jahra
Sulaibiya & Government Housing
Saad Al Abdullah City
Jahra & Al-Birr area

References 
The areas are officially stated by Ministry of Interior circular. (The numbering above is also by the Ministry of Interior)

Geography of Kuwait
Electoral districts of Kuwait